The 2013 season for  began in January at the Tour Down Under. As a UCI ProTeam, they were automatically invited and obligated to send a squad to every event in the UCI World Tour.

2013 roster

Riders who joined the team for the 2013 season

Riders who left the team during or after the 2012 season

Season victories

Footnotes

References

2013 road cycling season by team
2013 in Spanish road cycling
Euskaltel–Euskadi